The European Journal of Cardiovascular Nursing is a peer-reviewed nursing journal published by SAGE Publishing. It covers cardiovascular nursing research. It is an official journal of the European Society of Cardiology and the Association of Cardiovascular Nursing and Allied Professions.

History
The journal was established in 2002 by Tiny Jaarsma, Bengt Fridlund, David R Thompson, and Simon Stewart. From 2002 till 2021, the editor-in-chief was Tiny Jaarsma  (Linköping University). The current editor-in-chief is Philip Moons (Katholieke Universiteit Leuven).

Abstracting and indexing
The journal is abstracted and indexed in:
Science Citation Index Expanded
Social Sciences Citation Index
EMBASE/Excerpta Medica
ProQuest databases
MEDLINE/PubMed
Scopus
According to the Journal Citation Reports, the journal has a 2017 impact factor of 2.651.

References

External links

Publications established in 2002
Cardiac nursing journals
SAGE Publishing academic journals
English-language journals
Bimonthly journals